John Port may refer to:

Sir John Port (judge) (1480–1541), judge, born in Chester, lived in Etwall, Derbyshire, England
Sir John Port (died 1557), son of above, born in Etwall, founded Repton School

See also
John Port Spencer Academy in Etwall, Derbyshire